Lee Jeong-eun (born 28 May 1996) is a South Korean professional golfer who currently plays on the LPGA Tour and the LPGA of Korea Tour. For scoring purposes, she is called Jeongeun Lee6 to differentiate herself from other Korean LPGA golfers with that name, including the older Jeongeun Lee5.

In 2019, Lee won her first major championship at the U.S. Women's Open, and was named the 2019 LPGA Louise Suggs Rolex Rookie of the Year.

LPGA of Korea Tour
Lee began playing on the LPGA of Korea Tour in 2016. When she joined the tour, there had already been five other players with the same name; the like-named players were differentiated by a number, so she started to be called "Jeongeun Lee6". Lee is a six-time champion on tour, winning four events in 2017 and two in 2018. She also led the money list both years.

LPGA Tour
Lee played her first LPGA Tour event in 2017, finishing in a tie for fifth place at the U.S. Women's Open. She made six starts in 2018, her best finish a tie for sixth at the Evian Championship.

In November 2018, Lee won the LPGA Q-Series and joined the tour full-time in 2019. In June 2019, she won the U.S. Women's Open by two strokes over Ryu So-yeon, Lexi Thompson and Angel Yin. It was her first victory on the LPGA Tour in addition to being her first major championship.

In July 2021, Lee tied the major championship scoring record with a 61 in the second round of the Evian Championship. She took a five-shot lead into the final round but ended up losing in a playoff to Minjee Lee.

Professional wins (8)

LPGA Tour wins (1)

LPGA Tour playoff record (0–2)

LPGA of Korea Tour wins (6)
2017 (4) Lotte Rent-a-Car Women's Open, MY Munyoung Queens Park Championship, High1 Resort Ladies Open, OK! Savings Bank Pak Se-ri Invitational
2018 (2) Hanwha Classic, KB Financial Star Championship

Events in bold are KLPGA majors.

All Thailand Golf Tour wins (1)
2018 Singha E-San Open

Major championships

Wins (1)

Results timeline
Results not in chronological order before 2019.

CUT = missed the half-way cut
NT = no tournament
T = tied

Summary

Most consecutive cuts made – 7 (2019 British – 2021 British)
Longest streak of top-10s – 3 (2018 Evian – 2019 U.S. Open)

LPGA Tour career summary

^ Official as of 2022 season

World rank
Position in Women's World Golf Rankings at the end of each calendar year.

Team appearances
The Queens (representing KLPGA): 2017 (winners)

Awards
 2019 LPGA Louise Suggs Rolex Rookie of the Year

References

External links
Lee Jeong-eun at the KLPGA Tour official site 

South Korean female golfers
LPGA of Korea Tour golfers
LPGA Tour golfers
Winners of LPGA major golf championships
Universiade medalists in golf
Universiade gold medalists for South Korea
Medalists at the 2015 Summer Universiade
People from Suncheon
1996 births
Living people